Malpaís can refer to:

Malpaís (landform)
The Malpais Legate, a.k.a. Joshua Graham, character in Fallout: New Vegas, a video game

Place names, real and fictional
Malpaís in Brave New World
Casa Malpaís
Malpais, Costa Rica
 A beach on the Pacific coast of Costa Rica, which is also the namesake of a short story by S. K. Azoulay.

Other
Malpaís (group)

See also
Malpais (disambiguation)